Maria Petrovna Maksakova Jr. (born 24 July 1977) is a German-born Russian opera singer, a guest soloist with Bolshoi Theater (since 2003), soloist with Moscow's Helikon-Opera (since 2006) and Mariinsky Opera Company (2011). She is the daughter of actress Lyudmila Maksakova and granddaughter of Maria Petrovna Maksakova Sr., a renowned Russian and Soviet opera singer. Maria is the laureate of several prestigious events (including the Moscow International Opera Festival in 2000 and the II Obraztsova International Competition in 2002). Her extensive chamber repertoire includes works by Schumann, Schubert, Tchaikovsky, Rakhmaninov, Rimsky-Korsakov.
In October 2016, Maksakova relocated from Moscow to Kyiv, Ukraine, with her husband Denis Voronenkov and baby son, saying that they were fleeing the political persecution of Voronenkov in Russia. On 23 March 2017, Voronenkov was murdered in Kyiv. She returned to Russia in January 2021.

Life and career
Maksakova was born in Munich, a daughter of the Soviet actress Lyudmila Maksakova and the Prague-born German businessman Peter Igenbergs, a son of Latvian Baltic German emigres. Maria spent her childhood at the village of Snegiri, outside Moscow, where Bolshoi Theatre soloists and many famous musicians had their summer dachas. She began studying music from the age of three and aged six enrolled at the piano department of the Moscow Conservatory's Central Music School where her teacher was the famous opera singer Natalia Schpiller. As a student, she went to Italy to study under Katya Ricciarelli and, on completing her studies there, made her debut at the Parma Opera House. Her other tutors were Mivako Matsumoto, Gianfranco Pastine and Zurab Sotkilava. With the latter, Maria toured Ukraine and Russia. In 1995, she graduated from the School with honours and at the age of fifteen decided to embark upon the career of a singer, joining the Russian Gnesin Academy of Music, the class of professor Margarita Miglau, a former Bolshoi Theatre soloist. In 1996, she enrolled into the Moscow State Law Academy which she graduated in 2002.

In 2000, Maria Maksakova took part in the Moscow Opera Festival and won the Best Debut prize for her interpretation of the part of Rosina in Il Barbiere di Siviglia. The same year, Evgeny Kolobov invited her to the Moscow Novaya Opera Theatre where (2000–2006) she sang Ophelia (Hamlet by Ambroise Thomas), Snegurochka (The Snow Maiden by Rimsky-Korsakov), Linda di Chamounix (Bravissimo, Gaetano Donizetti divertimento), Kseniya (Boris Godunov by Musorgsky), Zinaida (First Love by Andrei Golovin), and Leila (Les Pecheurs de Perles by Georges Bizet), among others.

In 2002, Maksakova was among the Yelena Obraztsova Young opera singers competition's winners and a year later she joined the Bolshoi as a guest soloist, appearing as Oscar (Un ballo in maschera by Giuseppe Verdi) and Musetta (La Boheme by Giacomo Puccini). In 2006, she joined the Moscow Helikon-Opera and there appeared as The Princess in Antonín Dvořák's Rusalka, Rosina in II Barbiere di Siviglia, Susanna in Mozart's Le nozze di Figaro and others.

In 2011, Maksakova joined the Mariinsky Opera Company where she sings Dorabella (Cosi fan tutte), Cherubino (Le nozze di Figaro), Frugola (Il tabarro), The Composer (Ariadne auf Naxos), Nicklausse (The Tales of Hoffmann), and Eboli (Don Carlos).

Maksakova is a TV presenter, co-host (from January 2010, alongside Svyatoslav Belza) of the Romantika Romansa series on the Russian Kultura TV. She appeared in several films (including The Barber of Siberia by Nikita Mikhalkov), and worked as a model. In 2002, Lancôme selected her for their projects in Russia.

She took part in international projects. She sang a recital in Musikverein (Vienna), and she sang concerts in Helsinki and Tokyo.

The Ukrainian journalist  Kostyantyn Doroshenko  published the book «Aria of Mary», a biography of Maria Maksakova with the brightest moments of her life and career.(2021). Review by Olga Mikhailova."Aria of Mary ": history in biography and vice versa.

Political activity

In December 2011, Maksakova became a member of parliament (State Duma), representing the pro-president United Russia Party.
Maksakova abstained twice during the vote on the anti-Magnitsky bill.

After originally voting for the Russian LGBT propaganda law in June 2013, Maksakova criticized it in a speech in the Duma in December 2013. She stated, that the law leads to increased violence against sexual minorities in Russia and that it tarnishes Russia's reputation abroad. The latter leading to less foreign investment in Russia and the discrimination of Russian artists abroad.

In May 2016, Maksakova lost the United Russia primaries in Saint Petersburg. She accused the authorities of vote manipulation and promised to complain to the party leaders.

In October 2016 (before the end of their parliamentary mandate), Maksakova and her husband and fellow Duma deputy Denis Voronenkov went into exile in Ukraine.

Personal life
Maksakova has German citizenship since she was born in Germany to a German father.

She has a son, Ilya, and daughter, Lyudmila, from a relationship with convicted felon and prominent thief in law .

Maksakova married former fellow Russian MP Denis Voronenkov (who also had two children from a previous relationship) in March 2015. Their son was born in April 2016. The couple met while working on a bill regulating the export of cultural artefacts. At the time, Voronenkov was an MP for the Communist Party of the Russian Federation.

Voronenkov and Maksakova moved to Kyiv, Ukraine, in October 2016 after the Russian Prosecutor-General's Office refused to launch a probe against Voronenkov recommended by the Investigative Committee of Russia. He was allegedly involved in an illegal property seizure (worth 127 million rubles) in Moscow.

In December 2016, Voronenkov became a Ukrainian citizen; according to Voronenkov, he was persecuted in Russia by the Russian Federal Security Service for speaking out against president Vladimir Putin and Kremlin policies, including the alleged drug trafficking by the FSB. On 23 March 2017, Voronenkov was murdered in Kyiv. Earlier that month, a court in Moscow had sanctioned Voronenkov's arrest in absentia in connection with his alleged illegal property seizure in Moscow. After the killing of her husband, Maksakova was reportedly given personal protection by the Ukrainian Security Service. The Office of the Prosecutor General of Ukraine has named Maksakova's former partner Vladimir Tyurin as the organizer of the murder of Voronenkov. In October 2017, Makskova said there was proof to confirm this. However, in April 2019, she claimed that Tyurin was innocent.

Discography
 Of Love Only (Лишь о любви. Music 2 Business, 2008)
 Stars Meekly Shone for Us (Нам звезды кроткие сияли, 2008)
 Songs by R.Schumann and F.Schubert (Р.Шуман, Ф.Шуберт. Песни., 2009) 
 Best Loved Arias (Любимые арии, 2009)
 In Seville (В Севилье, 2009)
 My Voice Is for You (Мой голос для тебя, 2010)

References

External links

1977 births
Living people
Russian mezzo-sopranos
Operatic mezzo-sopranos
People from Istrinsky District
Russian television presenters
Russian emigrants to Ukraine
Naturalized citizens of Ukraine
20th-century Russian women opera singers
21st-century Russian women opera singers
People of the Russo-Ukrainian War
Russian women television presenters
Sixth convocation members of the State Duma (Russian Federation)